Flat Lake is a natural lake in South Dakota, in the United States.

Flat Lake received its name from the flat terrain of the site.

See also
List of lakes in South Dakota

References

Lakes of South Dakota
Lakes of Marshall County, South Dakota